Southern University Historic District is a historic district located on Southern University campus in Baton Rouge, Louisiana.

When first listed, the  area comprised a total of 5 historic buildings, dating from c.1870 to 1928.

The historic district was listed on the National Register of Historic Places on May 20, 1999, with a boundary increase on April 16, 2020.

Contributing properties
The historical district contains a total of 5 contributing properties, built between c.1870 and 1928:

Laundry/Riverside Hall, built 1922 as a single story laundry. Some time in 1930s was enlarged and renamed Riverside Hall.
Industrial Building for Girls, built 1920. Also known as the Home Economics Building and McNair Hall.
Machine Shop, built 1921. No more existing.
Industrial Building for Boys, built 1921. Building was enlarged in 1940s. Also known as the Mechanical Arts Building and the Industrial Arts Building.
Martin L. Harvey Auditorium, built 1928. Now hosting the Southern University Museum of Art.
Southern University Archives Building, built c.1870. Also individually listed.

See also
National Register of Historic Places listings in East Baton Rouge Parish, Louisiana

References

Historic districts on the National Register of Historic Places in Louisiana
Neighborhoods in Baton Rouge, Louisiana
National Register of Historic Places in East Baton Rouge Parish, Louisiana